The Nordic Flag Society is an association of Nordic vexillologists. It has an official name in the languages of all the five countries in which its activities are principally based: Nordiska Flaggsällskapet (Swedish), Nordisk Flagselskab (Danish), Nordisk Flaggselskap (Norwegian), Pohjoismaiden Lippuseura (Finnish), and Norræna Fánafélagið (Icelandic). Founded in Copenhagen on 27 January 1973, the Nordic Flag Society is dedicated to the study of flags and promotion of vexillology in Scandinavia.
The Nordic Flag Society is a member of the International Federation of Vexillological Associations (FIAV). In 2003 the Nordic Flag Society hosted the XX. International Congress of Vexillology with Stockholm as the venue.
The Nordic Flag Society has its own flag, a Nordic cross flag with a fimbriated red cross on a yellow field. The arms of the cross meet to form a knot similar to that on the flag of the International Federation of Vexillological Associations.

Twice a year the Nordic Flag Society publishes the magazine Nordisk Flaggkontakt, a 60-page publication professionally printed in full colour since spring 2004 and carrying articles on Scandinavian and international vexillological topics in Scandinavian languages as well as in English.

External links
Nordic Flag Society Home page

International Federation of Vexillological Associations
Nordic Cross flags